Megantic-Compton is a former provincial electoral district in the Estrie region of Quebec, Canada. As of its final election, it included the municipalities of East Angus, Cookshire-Eaton, Lac-Mégantic, Weedon, Lac-Drolet and Chartierville.

It was created for the 1973 election from parts of Frontenac, Compton, and Wolfe electoral districts; despite the name, it did not include any part of the territory of the former Mégantic electoral district. Its final election was in 2008.  It disappeared in the 2012 election and the successor electoral district was the recreated Mégantic.

Members of National Assembly

Election results

|-
 
|Liberal
|Johanne Gonthier
|align="right"|9,204
|align="right"|45.09
|align="right"|

|}

|-
 
|Liberal
|Johanne Gonthier
|align="right"|8,701
|align="right"|32.98
|align="right"|

|-

|}

 
|Liberal
|Daniel Bouchard
|align="right"|11,135
|align="right"|47.09
|-

|-

|-

|-
 
|Liberal
|Fabien Bélanger
|align="right"|11,795
|align="right"|51.73
|align="right"|

|-

|-
|}

|-
 
|Liberal
|Fabien Bélanger
|align="right"|9,259
|align="right"|46.95
|align="right"|

|-

|-
 
|United Social Credit
|Jean-Paul Poulin
|align="right"|156
|align="right"|0.77
|align="right"|
|-
|}

|-

|-
 
|Liberal
|J. Omer Dionne
|align="right"|6,037
|align="right"|27.99
|align="right"|

|-
 
|Ralliement créditiste
|Robert Leroux
|align="right"|2,188
|align="right"|10.14
|align="right"|
|-
|}

|-
 
|Liberal
|J. Omer Dionne
|align="right"|9,815
|align="right"|47.96
|align="right"|
|-
 
|Ralliement créditiste
|Paul-André Latulippe
|align="right"|5,385
|align="right"|26.31
|align="right"|

|-

|-
|}

References

External links
Information
 Elections Quebec

Election results
 Election results (National Assembly)
 Election results (Elections Quebec)

Maps
 2001 map (Flash)
2001–2011 changes (Flash)
1992–2001 changes (Flash)
 Electoral map of Estrie region (as of 2001)
 Quebec electoral map, 2001

Former provincial electoral districts of Quebec